The Drowning Pool is a 1950 mystery novel by American writer Ross Macdonald, his second book in the series revolving around the cases of private detective Lew Archer.

Plot summary

Archer is hired by a woman to investigate a libellous letter she received. The family lives in the house situated on the line between two Southern Californian towns, one an idyllic, oil-rich town and the other the small, seedy town from which the oil comes, corrupt and destroyed by the industry. It is not long before Archer is more concerned with investigating murder instead of just blackmail.

The book was the basis of the 1975 Paul Newman film of the same name but the movie has radical departures from the plot of the novel, including moving the location to Louisiana.

Reception
The New York Times called the book "a fast moving, smoothly written first rate whodunnit." They named it one of the top mysteries of 1950.

References

1950 American novels
American novels adapted into films
Lew Archer (series)
Novels by Ross Macdonald
Alfred A. Knopf books
Novels set in California
American detective novels
American thriller novels
Novels set in Los Angeles